Sagging is a manner of wearing trousers or jeans that sag so that the top of the trousers or jeans is significantly below the waist, sometimes revealing much of the wearer's underpants.

Sagging is predominantly a male fashion. Women's wearing of low-rise jeans to reveal their G-string underwear (the "whale tail") is not generally described as sagging. A person wearing sagging trousers is sometimes called a "sagger", and in some countries this practice is known as "low-riding".

Origin
The style was popularized by hip-hop musicians in the 1990s. 

It is often claimed the style originated from the United States prison system where belts are sometimes prohibited and there can be a lack of appropriately sized clothing. As a result, their pants would sag.

Reaction

During the 2000s, many North American local governments, school systems, transit agencies, and even airlines passed laws and regulations against the practice of wearing sagging pants, although no state or federal laws have been enacted banning the practice. US presidential candidate Barack Obama, speaking just before the 2008 US Presidential Election, appeared on MTV and said that laws banning the practice of wearing low-slung pants that expose one's underwear were "a waste of time ... Having said that, brothers should pull up their pants. You are walking by your mother, your grandmother, your underwear is showing. What's wrong with that? Come on. Some people might not want to see your underwear. I'm one of them."

In June 2007, the Town Council of Delcambre, Louisiana, passed an indecent exposure ordinance, which prohibited intentionally wearing trousers in such a way as to show underwear. In March 2008, the Hahira, Georgia City Council passed a controversial clothing ordinance, in the name of public safety, that bans citizens from wearing pants with top below the waist that reveal skin or undergarments. The council was split 2–2, but the tie was broken by the mayor. Pagedale, Missouri is also another to have passed this law in 2008.

Benetta Standly, statewide organizer for the American Civil Liberties Union of Georgia stated, "In Atlanta, we see this as racial profiling ... It's going to target African-American male youths. There's a fear with people associating the way you dress with crimes being committed." The interim police chief of Flint, Michigan ordered the arrest of saggers for disorderly conduct; however, only warnings had been issued. The local chapter of the ACLU threatened legal action in response, saying that sagging did not violate the Flint disorderly conduct ordinance and a Florida judge threw out a case brought under a similar rule, as being unconstitutional.

Sagging clothing is a violation of some school dress codes, and the prohibition has been supported in the court system.

Two weeks after the "Pants on the Ground" video became popular due to American Idol (see below), a billboard campaign against the style of sagging pants was launched in the Dallas, Texas, area. The billboards feature Big Mama Joseph from the 1997 film Soul Food saying, "Pull 'Em Up!" and asks youngsters to "Keep it a secret!" The campaign is the brainchild of Dallas Mayor Pro Tem Dwaine R. Caraway, and uses advertising space donated by Clear Channel Outdoor. Another billboard campaign against sagging pants was launched in Brooklyn, New York by New York State Senator Eric Adams on March 28, 2010. In May 2010, New York State Senate President Malcolm Smith used US$2,200 from his campaign fund to launch a similar campaign in Queens.

At the 2010 Winter Olympics in Vancouver, Japanese snowboarder Kazuhiro Kokubo was barred from participating in the opening ceremonies due to dressing sloppily, including a loosened tie, shirt hanging out, and sagging pants.

In the fall of 2010 at Westside Middle School in Memphis, Tennessee, the policy on handling sagging pants is for students to pull them up or get "Urkeled", a reference to the character Steve Urkel of the 1990s television show Family Matters. In this practice, teachers would pull their pants up and attach them there using zip ties. Students would also have their photo taken and posted on a board in the hallway, for all of their classmates to see. In an interview with WMC-TV, Principal Bobby White stated that the general idea is to fight pop culture with pop culture. One teacher at the school claimed to have "Urkeled" up to 80 students per week, although after five weeks students got the message, and the number dropped to 18.

On November 23, 2010, Albany, Georgia passed a city ordinance that banned the wearing of pants or skirts with top more than three inches below the top of the hips, and imposed a fine of $25 for the first offense, increasing to up to $250 for subsequent offenses. By September 2011, City Attorney Nathan Davis reported that 187 citations had been issued and fines of $3,916 collected.

On December 8, 2010, the city of Opa-locka, Florida voted unanimously on a $250 fine or 10 hours of community service for individuals who did not pull their pants up.

In Fort Worth, Texas, the local transportation authority implemented a policy in June 2011 that prohibited any passenger from boarding a bus while wearing sagging pants that exposes their underwear or buttocks. Signs were posted on buses saying, "Pull 'em up or find another ride", and one City Council member was looking for funds for a billboard campaign. The communications manager for the Fort Worth Transportation Authority said that on the first day the policy was enforced, 50 people were removed from buses for wearing improper pants. Some complained about the policy, but the overall response was positive.

A state law went into effect in Florida for the 2011–2012 school year banning the practice of sagging while at school. Pupils found in violation receive a verbal warning for the first offense, followed by parental notification by the principal for the second offense, which will require the parent to bring a change of clothing to school. Students would then face in-school suspension for subsequent violations.

University of New Mexico football player Deshon Marman was removed from a U.S. Airways flight bound for Albuquerque, New Mexico for wearing sagging pants. A few months later, Green Day singer Billie Joe Armstrong was removed from a Southwest Airlines flight from Oakland to Burbank, California for the same reason.

In April 2012, Alabama County Circuit Judge John Bush sentenced 20-year-old LaMarcus Ramsey to three days in jail for appearing in court with sagging blue jeans that exposed his underwear, telling him, "You are in contempt of court because you showed your butt in court."

On June 12, 2013, the Town Council of Wildwood, New Jersey, located on the Jersey Shore, voted unanimously to ban sagging pants from the town's boardwalk.

In Ocala, Florida, a law was passed against sagging jeans, violators face a $500 fine or up to six months in jail. Something similar was done in Wildwood, New Jersey.
 
In September 2015, students at Hinds Community College in Mississippi protested college authorities for the right to sag their pants. The protest was prompted by the arrest of a student for sagging in violation of the college's dress code.

On July 5, 2016, an ordinance was passed in Timmonsville, South Carolina that punishes sagging pants. Offenders may face up to a $600 fine.

Shreveport, Louisiana repealed its prohibition on sagging pants in June 2019.

Opa-locka in Miami-Dade County, Florida, voted 4–1 to repeal their ban on 'saggy pants' in September, 2020.

Music videos
Sagging has been ridiculed in music videos, first in the 1996 song "Back Pockets on the Floor" performed by the Green Brothers of Highland Park, Michigan. Another song in 2007 by Dewayne Brown of Dallas, Texas, titled "Pull Your Pants Up", has a similar message. On January 13, 2010, "General" Larry Platt performed "Pants on the Ground" during auditions for the ninth season of American Idol in Atlanta, Georgia. In 2012, a nine-year-old rapper named Amor "Lilman" Arteaga wrote a song titled "Pull Ya Pants Up", and made a music video with an appearance by Brooklyn borough president Marty Markowitz.

See also 

 Buttock cleavage
 Wide leg jeans
 Loose socks

References

External links 
 

2000s fashion
2010s fashion
African-American-related controversies
Clothing controversies
Hip hop fashion
History of clothing (Western fashion)
Trousers and shorts